Václav Beneš Optát (died 1559) was a Czech Utraquist Hussite priest. In 1533 he published as co-author with Petr Gzel of Prague the first Czech Grammar (Grammatika česká v dvojí stránce). In the same year he published his Czech translation of the New Testament based on Erasmus' edition.

References

Year of birth unknown
1559 deaths
People from Telč
People from the Margraviate of Moravia
Hussite people
Translators of the Bible into Czech
16th-century linguists
Linguists from the Czech Republic